Orange Marmalade is a South Korean manhwa series written and illustrated by Seok-woo. It was adapted into a TV series of the same name in 2015.

Plot 
Vampires were once hunted to extinction, but for the last 200 years there’s a peace treaty between humans and vampires. Now vampires are living amongst the humans hiding their nature by drinking only pig blood. However, vampires are still predators by nature and still desire human blood.

This is a story about a vampire named Baek Ma-ri, who tries to conceal her identity from the world. Seeing vampires as monsters, the humans shun them and wish that they would die out already. Until one day, Jae-min's sweet-smelling blood made Ma-ri lose control of herself, resulting in a new sweet beginning.

Characters 
 Baek Ma-ri
 Ma-ri is the female protagonist of the story. She is a vampire trying to conceal her real identity from the world. In the beginning, Ma-ri is shown to be very quiet and lacking in emotion. She also turned down multiple boys without hesitation, thus earning her the nickname "Ice Princess". Despite this fact, she is still one of the more sought after girls. It's revealed that her aversion to forming relationships is due to the fact that at her last school she was ridiculed when her friends found out she was a vampire. Ma-ri's life all starts to turn around when Jae-min's sweet-smelling blood made her lose control of herself, resulting in biting his neck. After this incident, Jae-min began to have interest on her and kept chasing her, she slowly develops a love interest for him. Later on the story, she and Jae-min finally started dating.

 Jung Jae-min
 Jae-min is the male protagonist of the story. He is charming and an extremely skilled basketball player. He is one of the most popular boys in school but he cares the least. Jae-min is shown as a misogynist but the reason isn't that he really hates women. In truth, he hates their touch as it reminds him of his stepmother who used to beat him up for everything. His life started to turn around when his sweet-smelling blood made Ma-ri lose control of herself, resulting in biting his neck. After this incident, he has been confused of his feelings and kept on chasing her to try to make the situation clear, even joining the Band Club. As the story progress, he falls in love with Ma-ri and cares for her the most. He is ready to beat anyone who hurts her. He is seen to be smiling more when he is with Ma-ri. He asked her to never leave his side. Later on the story he and Ma-ri finally started dating.

 Jung Soo-ri
 Soo-ri is Ma-ri's first friend. Initially not thinking much about Ma-ri, she became entranced by her guitar playing after witnessing it by chance, and persistently tries to get her to join the band club. Soo-ri was originally openly hostile about vampires, even openly badmouthing them in front of Ma-ri while having no idea she was a vampire. After Ma-ri saves her life, getting injured in the process, Soo-ri's entire opinion of vampires is changed and she becomes protective of Ma-ri, even standing up for her when Ah-ra found out. Soo-ri's mother is ill with cancer and she's constantly worried about her.

 Even though they have the same surname, Soo-ri isn't related to Jung Jae-min in any way.

 Do Woo-mi
 Woo-mi is Ma-ri's second friend, via Soo-ri. When she found out Ma-ri was a vampire, she accepted her without hesitation. However, she grew a bit scared of her after witnessing Si-hoo drinking Chae-rin's blood, even more so after an incident where a vampire seemed to have attacked and killed someone. That incident was later revealed to be a hoax by some anti-vampire criminals, but Woo-mi was still timid with Ma-ri for awhile. After Ma-ri's identity as a vampire was revealed to the school, Woo-mi regretfully watched as Ma-ri was ridiculed and bullied, but eventually overcame her fears and regrets and befriended Ma-ri again.

 Jo Ah-ra 
 Ah-ra is the antagonist of the story. She saw Ma-ri as her rival for Jae-min. She constantly tried to intimidate Ma-ri, but all her attempts failed miserably. Ah-ra finds out Ma-ri is a vampire and tries to use this against her, but she was stopped by Si-hoo. Later, she joined the Band Club. She begins to be nicer towards Ma-ri after this, but still tries to steal Jae-min from her. When the whole school finds out that Ma-ri is a vampire, Ah-ra becomes very protective of her, as shown when she took Chae-rin's phone when she tried to report Ma-ri to the Vampire Reporting Center and threatened to wipe Chae-rin off the face of the planet if she hurt Ma-ri. She seemed to care for Ma-ri at the end of the season, but usually denies it.

 Han Si-hoo
 Si-hoo is Ma-ri's fiancee who was later introduced in the story. Due to the shortage of vampires, he and Ma-ri were arranged to be married since they were both very young. He thinks highly of himself. He doesn't trust humans at all, believing they're nothing more than food and that no human, not even Ma-ri's friends, will ever accept vampires or that that will ever change, despite mounting evidence to the contrary. He doesn't hesitate to badmouth humans every chance he gets. Yet, he also seems to have a caring side, as he defended Ma-ri when Ah-ra threatens to tell the whole school that Ma-ri is a vampire. When Ah-ra joins the Band Club, he joins too in order to protect Ma-ri from her. He likes Ma-ri and hence gets agitated when Jae-min hurt her feelings and made her cry. He later on confessed that he liked Ma-ri and asked her what does she like about Jae-min to be going out with a human even though she is a vampire. Si-hoo is also known to have drunk the blood of Chae-rin, who self-proclaims herself to be his girlfriend, but he later reveals he never had any emotional attachment to her. Near the end of the story, he goes on a binge drinking his entire supply of human blood, causing his long-dormant vulnerability to sunlight to resurface, forcing him to cover himself in bandages to protect himself from the sunlight. At the end of the story, he and Chae-rin disappeared as he claims that his kind of vampire is no longer allowed to exist.

 Ha Na-bi
 Na-bi is Ma-ri's aunt. She owns a cafe where Ma-ri sometimes sings and plays guitar. She is friends with Jae-min's mother.

Development 
Seok Woo (born 1984) launched his career with the webtoon Nostalgia in 2008, followed by the webtoons 17 Years Old, That Summer Day's Miracle, Days of Hana and She's Hopeless. At the Popcon Asia festival in Jakarta, Seok staid: "I didn't know how to make friends so I spent most time alone. By drawing comics, I could pour my heart out." He continued creating webtoons despite his parents' disapproval, and went on to study animation in university.

Orange Marmalade was released on WEBTOON from 2011 to 2013. Its first print volume was published on June 11, 2013.

Live-action drama 

A 12-episode South Korean live-action drama based on the series began airing on KBS2 on May 15, 2015. The series is co-directed by Lee Hyung-min and Choi Sung-bum, and stars Yeo Jin-goo as Jae-min, Kim Seolhyun as Ma-ri, and Lee Jong-hyun as Si-hoo.

Reception

Soon after WEBTOON was released in Indonesia in April 2015, Orange Marmalade became the most popular webtoon in the country. Orange Marmalade currently has a 9.68/10 rating on WEBTOON.

References

External links 
 Orange Marmalade at Naver WEBTOON 
 Orange Marmalade at LINE

Manhwa titles
2011 webtoon debuts
South Korean webtoons
Vampires in comics
Romantic comedy comics
School webtoons
School-themed comics
Naver Comics titles
Comics adapted into television series
2013 comics endings
2010s webtoons
Webtoons in print
Romance webtoons
Drama webtoons
Concluded webtoons